Khan were an English progressive rock band of the Canterbury Scene during 1971-1972.

Formed by Steve Hillage from Uriel, the initial line-up was Steve Hillage (guitar), Nick Greenwood (bass guitar, from The Crazy World of Arthur Brown), Dick Heninghem (organ) and Pip Pyle (percussion). Pyle quickly moved on to Gong and by the time the band played its first gig in June 1971 he had been replaced by Eric Peachey. In October 1971, Dick Heninghem left as well, replaced by Dave Stewart for the duration of the album sessions.

The album Space Shanty was released in June 1972, followed by a UK tour supporting Caravan, for which Canadian organist Val Stevens joined.  Songs like "Stranded" and "Driving To Amsterdam" attempt atmospheres reminiscent of Uriah Heep's epic ballads (something not often done in a direct and dedicated way in the Canterbury scene - while Kevin Ayers may be comparable, a key difference is that Hillage's lyrics and compositions aren't detached or ironic)

In the summer of 1972, Hillage put together a new version of the band, retaining Peachey but adding Dave Stewart on keyboards and Nigel Griggs on bass. New material was written and rehearsed, and a few live performances took place in September–October 1972, but Decca's refusal to commit to the release of a second album led Hillage to break up the band and join Kevin Ayers's band, then Gong. Some material on Steve Hillage's first solo album, Fish Rising, was originally planned for Khan's aborted second album.

While in Gong, Hillage continued to write riffs but the larger musical dimension drew more from Daevid Allen's psychedelic lyrics and story concepts. Hillage's solo work also mostly sees him playing within the more typical Canterbury jazz/prog (Caravan etc.), leaving Space Shanty as a fairly unusual 'one-off' type of recording.

Members
 Steve Hillage – guitar, vocals (1971-1972)
 Nick Greenwood – bass, vocals (1971-1972)
 Pip Pyle – drums (1971)
 Dick Henninghem – keyboards (1971)
 Eric Peachey – drums (1971-1972)
 Dave Stewart – keyboards (1971-1972, 1972)
 Val Stevens – keyboards (1972)
 Nigel Griggs – bass (1972)

Line-ups

Discography

References

External links
 

English progressive rock groups
Canterbury scene
Deram Records artists